Baron Carlo Mazza (Italian:Il barone Carlo Mazza) is a 1948 Italian musical comedy film directed by Guido Brignone and starring Nino Taranto, Silvana Pampanini and Enzo Turco. The film's art direction was by Virgilio Marchi.

Synopsis
A penniless baron desperately tries to reverse his fortune, and eventually attempts to marry a wealthy Mexican woman.

Cast
 Nino Taranto as Barone Carlo Mazza  
 Silvana Pampanini as Rosa Pezza  
 Enzo Turco as Cecè Rizzo 
 Franco Coop as Cosimo  
 Carlo Lombardi as Borgotti  
 Mario Riva as Annunciatore  
 Raimondo Van Riel as Zio Casimiro Pezza  
 Gianna Dauro as Edwige Mazza 
 Anna Corinto as La segretaria 
 Franca Del Frate as Elvira Pezza  
 Dianora Veiga as Lalla  
 Paolo Carlini as Fugi  
 Bruno Corelli as Il conte degli Strozzi  
 Olga Vittoria Gentilli as La principessa Strozzi  
 Nino Marchesini as Il nuovo rico  
 Augusto Di Giovanni as Il commendatore  
 Margherita Bossi as Sua moglie  
 Agostino Salvietti as Portiere d'albergo 
 Franco Pesce as Il maestro di musica  
 Diana Dei as Una invitata alla festa  
 Marino Maresca as Segretario del commendatore  
 Amalia Pellegrini as Vecchietta al funerale  
 Evelina Paoli as Amica della principessa  
 Marco Tulli as Padrone del contino #2 
 Claudio Ermelli as Padrone del contino

References

Bibliography
 D'Amico, Masolino. La commedia all'italiana. Il Saggiatore, 2008.

External links 

1948 films
Italian musical comedy films
1940s Italian-language films
Films directed by Guido Brignone
1948 musical comedy films
Italian black-and-white films
1940s Italian films